Professor Henry Kitchener, MD FRCOG FRCS(Glas) FMedSci, is a leading British expert in gynaecological oncology, based at the University of Manchester. He is a fellow of the Academy of Medical Sciences.

Research

Prof. Kitchener's work has centred on research into Human Papillomavirus ("HPV").

He is an advocate of HPV testing and cervical screening for women, and has led various trials for HPV vaccines, including a cervical screening of 25,000 women.

His research has been funded by a number of groups, including the Medical Research Council, Cancer Research UK, Wellbeing of Women, and other national and local charities.

Career

 MRCOG (1980)
 Florence and William Blair-Bell research fellow, University of Glasgow (1980–1982)
 Lecturer in obstetrics and gynaecology, University of Singapore (1983–1984)
 William Blair-Bell memorial lecturer, Royal College of Obstetricians and Gynaecologists (1985)
 Consultant obstetrician and gynaecologist, University of Aberdeen (1988–1996)
 FRCS(Glas) (1989)
 FRCOG (1994)
 Professor of gynaecological oncology, University of Manchester (1996–present)
 Vice-President of the British Society for Colposcopy and Cervical Pathology (1997–1999)
 President of the British Society for Colposcopy and Cervical Pathology (2000–2003)
 Fellow of the Academy of Medical Sciences (2007)
 Chair of the Gynaecological Cancer InterGroup (2008)

Publications

Professor Kitchener is the author and co-author of numerous peer-reviewed journal articles and books including:
 (2010) The development of priority cervical cancer trials: a Gynecologic Cancer InterGroup report. International journal of gynecological cancer, Official Journal of the International Gynecological Cancer Society, 20(6), 1092–100.
 (2008) Informing adolescents about human papillomavirus vaccination: what will parents allow? Vaccine, 26( 18),
 (2006) HPV testing in routine cervical screening: cross sectional data from the ARTISTIC trial. British Journal of Cancer, 95( 1), 56–61.
 (2003) Management of women who test positive for high-risk types of human papillomavirus: the HART Study. The Lancet.

References 

21st-century British medical doctors
British oncologists
British gynaecologists
1951 births
Living people
Medical doctors from Glasgow
Academics from Glasgow
Fellows of the Academy of Medical Sciences (United Kingdom)
Fellows of the Royal College of Obstetricians and Gynaecologists
Fellows of the Royal College of Physicians and Surgeons of Glasgow
Academics of the University of Manchester
Academic staff of the National University of Singapore